Myles Standish State Forest is a state forest located in the towns of Plymouth and Carver in southeastern Massachusetts, approximately 45 miles (70 km) south of Boston. It is the largest publicly owned recreation area in this part of Massachusetts and is managed by the Department of Conservation and Recreation (DCR).

Description
The forest surrounds 16 lakes and ponds, including several ecologically significant coastal kettle ponds.

Ecology

Species commonly found in Southeast Massachusetts pine barrens:

Plants

Trees
Pitch pine
Bear oak (scrub oak)
Dwarf chestnut oak (scrub oak)

Fruit-bearing
Hillside and lowbush blueberry
Black huckleberry
Bearberry
Birds'-foot violet

Animals

Birds
Eastern towhee
Eastern bluebird
Pine warbler
Prairie warbler
Whip-poor-will

Insects
Persius duskywing (endangered)
Frosted elfin
Slender clearwing sphinx moth
Barrens buck moth
Melsheimer's sack-bearing moth
Gerhard's underwing moth
Barrens tiger beetle (endangered)
Antlion

Reptiles
Northern red-bellied cooter
Eastern box turtle
Eastern hognose snake

Mammals
Fisher
Deer
Coyote

Activities and amenities
Recreational uses include swimming, hunting, fishing, kayaking, canoeing, and picnicking. Day-use areas are found at College Pond and Fearing Pond. Hunting is allowed during the season, and two Wildlife Management Areas within the forest are stocked with game birds in October and November. In the summer, the park offers interpretive programs, such as pond shore walks and cranberry bog explorations.

Trails
The forest offers fifteen miles (24 km) of paved bicycle trails, thirty-five miles (56 km) of horse trails, and thirteen miles (21 km) of hiking trails. The "Bicycle Trails of Carver" were included in the Massachusetts Department of Travel and Tourism's list of 1000 great places in Massachusetts. Some popular trails in the park include Bentley Loop Trail, East Head Reservoir Trail, Friends' Trail, Charge Pond Loop Trail, Frost Pocket Loop Trail and Pine Barren's Trail.

Camping
Camping is offered at five sites, four of which are located at ponds: Curlew Pond, Fearing Pond, Charge Pond, Barrett Pond. A portion of the Charge Pond area is set aside for equestrian camping.

Ponds
The following table lists the ponds and recreational activities available at each in Myles Standish State Forest.

 = FORMAL ACCESS is available for recreational activity.
NFA = Recreational activity is permitted, but NO FORMAL ACCESS is available.
LA = LIMITED ACCESS for low impact recreational use is permitted, sensitive pond shore habitat.
NP = Recreational access NOT PERMITTED, habitat protection area.

Scouting
Cachalot Scout Reservation, a Boy Scout camp, encompasses  surrounding Five Mile Pond adjacent to Myles Standish State Forest. Camp Squanto is also located within Myles Standish State Forest as is Camp Wind-in-the-Pines, a girl scout camp.

Prison
A state correctional facility, MCI - Plymouth, is also located in Myles Standish State Forest.

In the news
On May 14, 1977, according to the Plymouth Police Department records, Eric H. Anderson Jr. murdered Ruth Masters (née Ruth Rydberg), a teacher in nearby Hanson, Massachusetts, while she was riding her bike alone on an isolated trail in the park. He was later found guilty and sentenced to life imprisonment in Maine State Prison in Warren, Maine.

References

External links

Myles Standish State Forest Department of Conservation and Recreation
Myles Standish State Forest Map Department of Conservation and Recreation
Friends of Myles Standish State Forest
www.nature.org

Plymouth, Massachusetts
Protected areas of Plymouth County, Massachusetts
Massachusetts state forests
Campgrounds in Massachusetts
Protected areas established in 1916
1916 establishments in Massachusetts